Marathon Futurex is an IT and financial business centre launched recently by the Marathon Group at Lower Parel, Mumbai. Marathon Futurex is proposed to be the tallest commercial property in India. It is centrally located at the busy junction of Lower Parel and Curry Road. It is in close proximity of major business houses like Peninsula Corporate Park, Phoenix Mills, Kamala Mills. The project, being developed in the Mafatlal Mill land complex, will have a total built-up area of about 1.1 million sq ft.

Construction technology
Marathon Futurex has been constructed using the  formwork technology of Sten (Spain) and Peri (Germany). It is an energy efficient structure with a full glass façade and modern elevation.

Marathon Futurex has a system to manage, maintain and secure the commercial premises through a Building Management System (BMS). BMS controls technical security features like CCTV, all electronic equipments, access control system, lift system, water and electronics management systems. The BMS system enables micro-check on all aspects of the building to ensure a secure environment to work.

Green architecture
Marathon Futurex is expected to get a gold rating from the Indian Green Building Council (IGBC) for its eco friendly design concept and construction methodology. A solar envelope Design study identified changing thermal patterns throughout the year based on which the cooling of the building has been designed. The building façade is made of double-glazed, Low-e glass that lets in the light but cuts out the heat. During the construction phase materials like fly ash, micro silicon, low volatile organic compound paints, adhesives and other recycled resources have been used to ensure minimal environment damage. The orientation of the building reduces the need for artificial cooling thus conserving energy.

Marathon Futurex has more than 15 sky gardens with glass fences that act as heat barriers during the day. There is a rain water harvesting system  and a captive sewage-disposal-plant that aims at zero discharge of water thus helping in water conservation when the building becomes fully functional.

See also
 List of tallest buildings in India
 List of tallest structures in India
 List of tallest buildings in Mumbai

References

External links
 Official Website

Buildings and structures under construction in India
Skyscraper office buildings in Mumbai